Frenzel is a German family name that originated in the Rhineland, and today is prevalent among Volga Germans and in east-central Germany, focused on Dresden. It is a patronymic name meaning son of Franciscus.

There are several historical figures named Frenzel:
 Alfred Frenzel - Cold War-era Czechoslovakian spy
 Anton Frenzel (1790-1873), bishop of Ermland
 Bartholomäus Frenzel (mention 1576), German poet
 Bill Frenzel (1947-2014), Minnesota Congressman
 Elisabeth Frenzel (1915-2014), German literary notable
 Eric Frenzel (1988-), German skier
 Ernst Frenzel (born 1904), German banker, SA brigade leader and Reichstag delegate
 Fritz Frenzel (1855-1915), German writer and publisher (alias August Bäbchen)
 Gotfried Frenzel (born 1929), German art historian and restorer
 Hans Frenzel (1921-1989), German broadcast director
 Herbert Frenzel (novelist), German novelist
 Herbert A. Frenzel (1908-1995), German theatre notable
 Hermann Robert Frenzel (1850-?), German organist and technical writer
 Hermann Walter Gotthold Frenzel (1895-?), German HNO physician and Luftwaffe officer, inventor of the Frenzel maneuver to balance pressure 
 Ivo Frenzel (1924-2014), German author, Daten deutscher Dichtung 
 Johann Gottlieb Frenzel (1715-1780), German lawyer, historian and philosopher
 Johann Gottlieb Abraham Frenzel (1782-1855), German coppersmith
 Karl Frenzel (1827-1914), German writer and critic
 Karl Frenzel (1911—1996) - German Nazi SS-Oberscharführer, one of Sobibor's SS commanders
 Michael Frenzel
 Oskar Frenzel (1855-1915), German animal and landscape painter
 Paul Frenzel (1824-1872), German animal and landscape painter
 Walther Frenzel (1884-1970), German engineer and professor of textile chemistry
 Bob Frenzel (1970-), CEO and COO of Xcel Energy.

Further, there are several businesses named Frenzel, among them a Düsseldorf manufacturer.

See also 

 Curt Frenzel Stadium

References 

German-language surnames